John Wilkie (born 1 July 1947) is a Scottish retired footballer. He played for several clubs in Scotland before signing for Halifax Town in the Football League Third Division in 1973. In 1976, he joined Wigan Athletic following a two-year spell back in Scotland with Elgin City FC, then in the Scottish Highland Football League. In the 1977–78 season, he was the top goalscorer for the club in the Northern Premier League, helping the club gain election into The Football League.

References

External links

1947 births
Living people
Footballers from Dundee
Scottish footballers
Brechin City F.C. players
Arbroath F.C. players
Raith Rovers F.C. players
Greenock Morton F.C. players
Ross County F.C. players
Halifax Town A.F.C. players
English Football League players
Elgin City F.C. players
Wigan Athletic F.C. players
Keith F.C. players
Chorley F.C. players
Association football wingers
Scottish Football League players